This is a list of Billboard magazine's ranking of the top country singles of 1967. "All the Time" by Jack Greene ranked as the year's No. 1 country single.

The ranking was based on performance on the Billboard country charts during the first eight months of 1967. Accordingly, the list excludes songs like Tammy Wynette's "I Don't Wanna Play House" and Sonny James' "It's the Little Things", which reached No. 1 later in the year.

See also
List of Hot Country Singles number ones of 1967
List of Billboard Hot 100 number ones of 1967
1968 in country music

Notes

References

1967 record charts
Billboard charts
1967 in American music